Harvey Peak is an ice-free peak,  high, standing  south of the Finger Ridges in the Cook Mountains of Antarctica. It was mapped by the United States Geological Survey from tellurometer surveys and Navy air photos, 1959–63, and was named by the Advisory Committee on Antarctic Names for Paul Harvey, a member of the U.S. Army aviation support unit for Topo North and Topo South (1961–62) which conducted the tellurometer surveys.

References

Mountains of Oates Land